Serge Wilmes (born 6 May 1982) is a Luxembourgeois politician, serving in the Chamber of Deputies as a member of the Christian Social People's Party (CSV).

Biography

Early life 
Originally from the Quarter of Merl in Luxembourg City, Wilmes graduated from lycée Michel-Rodange in 2001. Following graduation, Wilmes studied at Université Nancy-II where he received his maîtrise in history in 2005. The next year, Wilmes received his second-level masters in Contemporary European History from the Université du Luxembourg. His master's thesis was on the position of right-wing Catholic movements on Abortion in the 1970s.

Wilmes worked for the National Archives of Luxembourg from 2007 to 2008.,

Political career 
A member of Christian Social People's Party since 2000, Wilmes was encouraged by Michel Wolter to serve as a parliamentary advisor for the party in the  Chamber of Deputies, a position he held from 2008 to November 2011. In the meantime, Wilmes was elected president of the party's youth movement, a position he held until February 2014.,

In accordance with the Constitution, Wilmes was sworn in on 11 October 2011 and served the remainder of Thiel's term in the Centre constituency.,. Wilmes was re-elected in the 2013 and 2018 elections.

During the 2017 communal elections, Wilmes was elected to the Luxembourg City Communal Council, where he became an échevin.

In February 2019, Wilmes stood as a candidate for leadership of the Christian Social People's Party, going up against MEP Frank Engel.,. Despite losing to Engel, Wilmes maintained a lot of popularity prior to the convention to elect Engel's successor. However, in 2021, Claude Wiseler was elected the new leader of the CSV.

Publications

References 

Members of the Chamber of Deputies (Luxembourg) from Centre
Christian Social People's Party politicians
Luxembourgian politicians
1982 births
Nancy-Université alumni
University of Luxembourg alumni
Living people